Khawmawi is a border village in Myanmar which lies next to Zokhawthar village of Champhai district of Mizoram, India.

India-Myanmar border 
It has a border check-post.

See also 

 Borders of India

References 

India–Myanmar border crossings